Nicholas Bullingham (or Bollingham) (c. 1520–1576) was an English cleric who became the Bishop of Lincoln and Bishop of Worcester.

Life

Nicholas Bullingham was born in Worcester around 1520. He was sent to the Royal Grammar School Worcester. In 1536 he became a Fellow of All Souls College, Oxford, graduating BCL in 1541, DCL in 1546 (or he supplicated for DCL but was not admitted). He was created LL.D. at Cambridge in 1559 (incorporated DCL at Oxford in 1566).

After his education in law, Bullingham entered the church, becoming Archdeacon of Lincoln in 1549. On the accession of Queen Mary, Bullingham, being married and Protestant, was deprived of the archdeaconry and his other church positions, and went into exile at Emden.

On the accession of Queen Elizabeth, Bullingham returned to England, resumed his church positions, and became a private chaplain to Archbishop Parker, who often consulted him on legal matters. He became Bishop of Lincoln in 1560, and finally returned to his old city as Bishop of Worcester until his death in 1576. While in Worcester, he greeted the Queen on her visit to the city in 1575.

Bullingham is buried in Worcester Cathedral in an unusual tomb, with an inscribed tablet on his stomach.

Marriages and issue
Bullingham married firstly Margaret Sutton (d.1566), daughter of Hamond Sutton of Washingborough, Lincolnshire, by whom he had two sons, Francis Bullingham  (1553–c.1636) and Nicholas Bullingham (1566–1639), and two daughters, both named Susan, who died in 1561 and 1564 respectively.

He married secondly, about 1569, Elizabeth Lok (1535–c.1581). She was the widow of the London mercer and alderman Richard Hill (d.1568), by whom she had had thirteen children, and was the daughter of Sir William Lok and his first wife, Alice Spenser (d.1522). By his second wife Bullingham had a son, John (baptized 1570).

Notes

References

External links
Will of Richard Hill, Mercer of London, proved 13 November 1568, PROB 11/50/351, National Archives Retrieved 19 November 2013

1520s births
1576 deaths
Fellows of All Souls College, Oxford
People educated at the Royal Grammar School Worcester
Bishops of Lincoln
Bishops of Worcester
16th-century Church of England bishops
1520 births